Delaware County Courthouse may refer to:

 Delaware County Courthouse (Iowa), Manchester, Iowa
 Delaware County Courthouse Square District, in Delhi, New York
 Delaware County Courthouse (Ohio), Delaware, Ohio
 Delaware County Courthouse (Pennsylvania), Media, Pennsylvania